Lago di Poschiavo is a natural lake in the Val di Poschiavo in the Swiss canton of Graubünden.

Geography 
The lake is both fed and drained by the Poschiavino river and drains to the south, with its water eventually reaching the Mediterranean via the rivers Adda and Po.

The lake lies within the municipality of Poschiavo, and the villages of Le Prese and Miralago lie at its northern and southern ends respectively. The Bernina railway line runs alongside the western side of the lake, with stations at Le Prese and Miralago. The main valley road (Hauptstrasse 29) follows a higher route on the same side of the lake. A level hiking trail circumnavigates the lake, with some sections on the more precipitous eastern side in tunnel.

The lake was first referred to in 1010, when the newly founded monastery of San Abbondio in Como was granted fishing rights on the lake.

Between 1904 and 1907 the lake was converted into a reservoir as part of a series of hydro-electric power plants in the Val di Poschiavo that are fed from the Lago Bianco.

There are current proposals to construct a pumped storage scheme based on Lago di Poschiavo and Lago Bianco, which is some  higher. This would have a total installed capacity of 1000 MW and would consume electricity to pump water to the higher level at times of low demand and release water to generate electricity in times of high demand. The proposals have received formal consent from the cantonal authorities, but  are not believed to be financially viable.

See also
List of lakes of Switzerland
List of mountain lakes of Switzerland

References

External links

Poschiavo
Poschiavo
Val Poschiavo
Poschiavo